Wisdom Amey (born 11 August 2005) is an Italian professional footballer who plays as a centre-back for  club Bologna.

Career
Amey is a youth product of Bassano Virtus and Vicenza Virtus, before moving to the youth academy of Bologna in 2019. He made his professional debut with Bologna in a 2–0 Serie A loss to Genoa on 12 May 2021, coming on as a late substitute in the 89th minute. At the age of 15 years and 274 days, Amey became the youngest debutant in Serie A history.

International career
Amey was born in Italy in 2005 to a Togolese father and Nigerian mother, being, thus, eligible for all of these 3 countries' nationa football teams. On 17 March 2023 he accepted the call from Togo Under-23 but was not able to debut due to an injury.

Career statistics

References

External links
 
 Bologna FC Profile

2005 births
Living people
People from Bassano del Grappa
Italian footballers
Italian people of Togolese descent
Italian people of Nigerian descent
Italian sportspeople of African descent
Bologna F.C. 1909 players
Serie A players
Association football fullbacks
Sportspeople from the Province of Vicenza
Footballers from Veneto